Datuk Seri Utama Tengku Adnan bin Tengku Mansor (Jawi: تڠكو عدنان بن تڠكو منصور; born 20 December 1950) is a Malaysian politician who served as Minister of Federal Territories, Minister of Tourism and Minister in the Prime Minister's Department in the Barisan Nasional (BN) administration under former Prime Ministers Abdullah Ahmad Badawi and Najib Razak from November 2002 to the collapse of the BN administration in May 2018, Member of Parliament (MP) for Putrajaya from March 2004 to November 2022. He is a member of and has also served as Treasurer-General of the United Malays National Organisation (UMNO), a component party of the ruling BN coalition which is aligned with another ruling Perikatan Nasional (PN) coalition, since June 2018. He also served as Secretary-General of UMNO from March 2009 to June 2018.

In 2018, he was charged with corruption for allegedly accepting bribe by a businessman, which he denied. In 2020, he was convicted and sentenced to jail. The conviction was overturned on appeal in 2021.

Early life and education
Born in Malacca, Malaysia, Adnan obtained a Diploma in Business Administration from Mara Technology Institute, which is now known as Universiti Teknologi MARA, and a Bachelor of Business Administration (BBA) from the University of Southern California.

Adnan held important positions in the corporate sector, such as Director and Chairman of Far East Asset (FEA) and Chairman of UNZA Holdings Bhd.

Political career
Adnan joined politics in the early 1980s. He became Treasurer of the UMNO Youth wing in 1988. He was elected to the UMNO Supreme Council in 1993 but lost the position in 1996. He was appointed as Federal Territory liaison chairman in June 2000. On 29 November 2001, he was appointed the Chairman of the Federal Territory Barisan Nasional. In 2003, he was appointed the Chief of the Putrajaya UMNO, and later he won the position again uncontested in the party election in June 2004. In September 2004, he was successful in a bid for an UMNO Supreme Council seat.

Adnan won the Parliamentary seat of Putrajaya in the March 2004 general election by defeating Abdul Rahman Othman of Parti Keadilan Rakyat (KeADILan).

Adnan was appointed as the Tourism Minister, replacing Datuk Dr. Leo Michael Toyad, on 14 February 2006. He was dropped from the cabinet following the March 2008 general election, where the ruling Barisan Nasional coalition received a serious drubbing at the polls.

After his victory for third time in 2013 general election, Adnan has returned to the cabinet and appointed as Minister of the Federal Territories.

In the 2018 general election, Adnan was reelected to the Parliament. However, he lost his cabinet post as BN was relegated to opposition while the federal government was taken over by Pakatan Harapan (PH).

Corruption case 
On 15 November 2018, Tengku Adnan pleaded not guilty for accepting RM2 million from Aset Kayamas director Chai Kin Kong via cheque deposited to Tadmansori Holding which Tengku Adnan had interests in. He was allowed bail of RM1 million.

On 2 July 2019, the trial began. 23 witnesses called including Chai and former Kuala Lumpur City Hall mayors, Ahmad Phesal Talib and  Mohd Amin Nordin.

On 17 July 2019, Chai took out RM2 million receipt from his wallet which he said is evidence of payment by Umno, to show the sum is for political donation. “Yes, it is in my pocket now” – he said when asked by lead counsel Tan Hock Chuan if he kept any such document.

On 14 October 2019, Tengku Adnan ordered by the High Court to enter his defence on the corruption charges against him.

On 17 January and 5 March 2020, Tengku Adnan’s defence proceedings were held for two days. He admitted receiving a RM2 million cheque from Chai for the expense of the Barisan Nasional election campaign on 14 June 2016. But, he did not report this to the party hierarchy as the money has nothing to do with Umno HQ.

On 30 June 2020, Tengku Adnan was the first defence witness and the defence closed its case after calling four witnesses.

On 21 December 2020, Judge Mohamed Zaini Mazlan said defence failed to challenge evidence brought by the prosecution. Tengku Adnan found guilty for receiving RM2 million of graft from Chai. He was sentenced to jail, fined RM2 million.

On 13 January 2021, Tengku Adnan was found guilty of a RM2 million graft charge towards the year-end, but was discharged on a charge involving RM1 million only a fortnight earlier.

On 25 January 2021, Tengku Adnan filed an appeal on 21 December last year against his conviction.

On 22 April 2021, the Court of Appeal is hearing an appeal by Tengku Adnan against his conviction for receiving RM2 million in kickbacks from Chai Kin Kong. Chai had testified that the funds were a political donation, but the High Court judge did not accept this. Tengku Adnan's counsel is arguing that the judge was wrong in not accepting Chai's testimony and that the receipt issued to the businessman for the funds shows that the payment was a political donation. The prosecution is arguing that the receipt was fabricated and that Chai was not impeached as a witness because he was recognised as biased towards Tengku Adnan. The court has adjourned to consider its decision.

On 22 April 2021, the judge overturned the conviction of Tengku Adnan on corruption charges. The original conviction was based on the testimony of Chai Kin Kong, who said that Adnan had received a RM2 million payment from him. However, the judge ruled that there was not enough evidence to prove that Adnan had actually received the money, and that the payment may have been for political donations instead.

Controversies and issues

Lingam Videoclip controversy

Adnan was called to testify in front of a Royal Commission of Inquiry into the Lingam Video Clip investigating the allegation of illegal intervention in the appointment process of Malaysian judges that allegedly occurred in 2002. The formation of the commission was a follow-up to a recommendation by a three-man panel which was tasked to determine the authenticity of a video clip of a telephone conversation that raised the allegation.

Following the findings of the Royal Commission, the Malaysian cabinet ordered the Attorney-General to immediately direct agencies to investigate the allegations levelled against six prominent individuals identified in the Lingam video clip affair. The six are former prime minister Mahathir Mohamad, retired chief justices Mohd Eusoff Chin and Ahmad Fairuz Sheikh Abdul Halim, former minister in the Prime Minister's Department Tengku Adnan Mansor, tycoon Vincent Tan and prominent lawyer V. K. Lingam.

There was sufficient cause to invoke the Sedition Act 1948, the Prevention of Corruption Act 1961, the Legal Profession Act 1976, the Official Secrets Act 1972 and the Penal Code against some of the principal individuals involved, however as of recently, no action has been taken by the Barisan Nasional government against the individuals involved.

Female bloggers controversy
Adnan was involved in controversy with regards to a statement he made about female bloggers where he was quoted as calling female bloggers liars. This caused an uproar among the blogger community and attracted a lot of negative reactions. He was quoted as saying in Malaysian Chinese newspaper Sin Chew Daily and Singaporean English daily, the Straits Times:

Federal territories expansion proposal
In 2017 Tengku Adnan participated in a radio interview in which he discussed his plan to expand the federal territories to include Penang, Langkawi and parts of Malacca. he explained that his goal was to "ensure equal development in the northern state".

Tax evasion
On 24 July 2019, the government had filed a lawsuit through the Inland Revenue Board (IRB), against Adnan to claim RM57.17 million in unpaid taxes since 2012 till 2017.

Title controversy
While Adnan claims that his title is not from Malaysia but hereditary from a line of Aceh warriors, researches show that his father, who is of Tamil descendants (but claims to be from Acehnese Teuku origin), only started using the title Tengku two years after Adnan did.

Personal life
Adnan is married to Datin Seri Utama Enny Beatrice Ferlat Kusumo Anggraini. They have two sons and four daughters; Iqbal, Natasya, Hafiz,  Nadira, Najwa and Nabila. Adnan has two sons and two daughters from his previous marriage; Daud, Balqish, Yazir and Nadiah.

Election results

Honours
 :
 Officer of the Order of the Defender of the Realm (KMN) (1992)
 Commander of the Order of Meritorious Service (PJN) – Datuk (2000)
  :
  Grand Knight of the Order of the Territorial Crown (SUMW) - Datuk Seri Utama (2011)
  :
  Knight Companion of the Order of Loyalty to the Royal House of Kedah (DSDK) - Dato' (1997)
  :
  Knight Grand Commander of the Order of the Life of the Crown of Kelantan (SJMK) - Dato' (2003)
  :
  Companion Class I of the Exalted Order of Malacca (DMSM) - Datuk (2000)
  Grand Commander of the Exalted Order of Malacca (DGSM) - Datuk Seri (2005)
  :
  Knight Companion of the Order of the Crown of Pahang (DIMP) - Dato' (1988)
  Knight Companion of the Order of Sultan Ahmad Shah of Pahang (DSAP) - Dato' (1990)
  Grand Knight of the Order of the Crown of Pahang (SIMP) - formerly Dato’, now Dato’ Indera (2003)
  Grand Knight of the Order of Sultan Ahmad Shah of Pahang (SSAP) - Dato' Sri (2006)
  :
  Grand Commander of the Order of Kinabalu (SPDK) - Datuk Seri Panglima (2017)

See also
Putrajaya (federal constituency)

References

 Utusan Malaysia, 15 February 2006

Officers of the Order of the Defender of the Realm
Commanders of the Order of Meritorious Service
1950 births
Living people
People from Malacca
Malaysian people of Malay descent
Malaysian people of Acehnese descent
Malaysian Muslims
United Malays National Organisation politicians
Members of the Dewan Rakyat
Members of the Dewan Negara
Government ministers of Malaysia
Marshall School of Business alumni
Grand Commanders of the Order of Kinabalu
21st-century Malaysian politicians